

Advertising and public relations

 Alvin Achenbaum (1925–2016), advertising executive, co-founder of Achenbaum and Associates, founder of the Achenbaum Institute of Marketing
 David R. Altman (1915–2000), co-founder of the Altman, Stoller, Weiss advertising agency
 Edward Bernays (1891–1995), Austrian-born pioneer in the field of public relations and propaganda
 William Bernbach (1911–1982), co-founder of international advertising agency Doyle Dane Bernbach (now DDB Worldwide Communications Group Inc.)
 Milton H. Biow (1892–1976), advertising executive, founder of the Biow Company
 Maxwell Dane (1906–2004), co-founder of international advertising agency Doyle Dane Bernbach (now DDB Worldwide Communications Group Inc.)
 David Deutsch (1929–2013), founder of Deutsch, Inc. (later led by his son, Donny (1957–); sold to IPG in 2000)
 Daniel Edelman (1920–2013), founder of PR firm Edelman, Inc. (now led by his son, Richard (1954–))
 Alvin Eicoff (1921–2002), founder of A. Eicoff & Company, inventor of direct response television (DRTV) advertising
 Arthur C. Fatt (1905–1999), advertising executive at the Grey Advertising Agency
 Lee Garfinkel (1955–), advertising executive, founder of the Garfinkel Group
 Al Fleishman (1905–2002), co-founder of PR and marketing agency FleishmanHillard Inc.
 Monroe Green (1904–1996), advertising director of the New York Times
 Michael Kempner (1958–), founder of PR firm MWWPR
 Julian Koenig (1921–2014), co-founder of advertising agency Papert Koenig Lois
 Albert Lasker (1880–1952), Prussian-born advertising pioneer, owner of the Lord & Thomas advertising agency (now Foote, Cone & Belding) and MLB's Chicago Cubs
 Norman B. Norman (1914–1991), advertising executive, co-founder of the Norman, Craig & Kummel agency (later renamed to NCK Organization)
 Shirley Polykoff (1908–1998), early female advertising executive
 Randall Rothenberg, CEO of iab.
 Howard J. Rubenstein (1932–2020), founder of public relations firm Rubenstein Associates
 Marian Salzman (1959–), advertising and PR executive, CEO of Havas PR North America, co-founder of Cyberdialogue
 Rich Silverstein (1949–), co-founder of advertising agency Goodby, Silverstein & Partners (GSP)
 Joseph Spiegel (1840–1914), German-born founder of direct marketing and catalog company Spiegel; member of the Spiegel family
 Carl Spielvogel (1928–2021), founder of marketing and advertising communications company Backer & Spielvogel
 Herbert D. Strauss (1909–1973), advertising executive at the Grey Advertising Agency
 Ken Sunshine (1948–), founder of Sunshine Sachs Consultants
 Linda Kaplan Thaler (1951–), advertiser, founder of the Kaplan Thaler Group (now Publicis New York) and Kaplan Thaler Productions
 Ronn Torossian (1974–), founder of 5W Public Relations (5WPR)
 Lawrence Valenstein (1899–1982), co-founder of the Grey Group
 Lester Wunderman (1920–2019), founder of Wunderman, Inc., creator of modern-day direct marketing and inventor of the toll-free 1-800 number
 Jordan Zimmerman (1955/56–), founder of Zimmerman Advertising, former co-owner of NHL's Florida Panthers
 Sergio Zyman (1945–), Mexican-American marketing executive, founder of the Zyman Group

Music industry

 Herb Abramson (1916–1999), founder of Atlantic Records
 Berle Adams (1917–2009), co-founder of Mercury Records and senior executive at MCA
 Lou Adler (1933–), co-founder of Dunhill Records, co-owner of West Hollywood's Roxy Theatre
 Moses Asch (1905–1986), Polish-born co-founder of Folkways Records
 Irving Azoff (1947–), chairman and CEO of Azoff MSG Entertainment, founder of Giant Records, co-founder of the Oak View Group, former chairman of MCA Inc. and Ticketmaster
 Marty Bandier (1941–), CEO of Sony/ATV, former chairman and CEO of EMI Music Publishing
 Emile Berliner (1851–1929), German-born co-founder of RCA Records
 Miriam Bienstock (1923–2015), former senior executive at Atlantic Records
 Jerry Blaine (1910–1973), co-founder of Jubilee Records
 Scott Samuel "Scooter" Braun (1981–), founder of School Boy Records, RBMG Records; manager of Justin Bieber, Ariana Grande
 Edgar Bronfman Jr. (1955–), former CEO of Warner Music Group (WMG); member of the Bronfman family
 Leonard (1917–1969) and Phil Chess (1921–2016), Polish-born founders of Chess Records; members of the Chess family
 Lew Chudd (1911–1998), Canadian-born founder of Imperial Records
 Alan N. Cohen (1930–2004), former VP of Warner Communications (now WarnerMedia), and (co-)owner of NBA's Boston Celtics and the New York Knicks
 Lyor Cohen (1959–), Israeli-American co-founder of 300 Entertainment, former president of Def Jam Recordings
 Clive Davis (1932–), former president of Columbia Records, founder of Arista Records, Inc. and J Records
 Ron Fair, former president of record labels A&M, Geffen, Virgin and senior artists and repertoire executive at RCA, Chrysalis, EMI
 Leo Feist (1869–1930), founder of music publishing firm Leo Feist, Inc.
 Jason Flom (1961–), founder of Lava Music, LLC, former chairman and CEO of Atlantic Records
 Milt Gabler (1911–2001), founder of Commodore Records
 David Geffen (1943–), founder of Geffen Records and DGC Records, co-founder of Asylum Records
 Jody Gerson (1961–), chairman of the Universal Music Publishing Group (UMPG)
 Joe Glaser (1896–1969), founder of the Associated Booking Corporation, manager of Louis Armstrong and Billie Holiday
 Daniel Glass, founder of Glassnote Records
 George Goldner (1918–1970), co-founder of record labels Tico, Gee, Rama, End, Gone, Roulette, Red Bird and Blue Cat 
 Richard Gottehrer (1940–), co-founder of music and entertainment company The Orchard
 Norman Granz (1918–2001), founder of Clef Records, Norgran Records, Verve Records and Pablo Records
 Al Green, founder of National Records
 Irving Green (1916–2006), co-founder of Mercury Records
 Florence Greenberg (1913–1995), founder of record labels Tiara, Scepter, Hob, and Wand
 Jerry Heller (1940–2016), co-founder of Ruthless Records; known for launching West Coast's gangsta rap movement
 Jac Holzman (1931–), founder of Elektra Records and Nonesuch Records
 Orrin Keepnews (1923–2015), co-founder of Riverside Records and Milestone Records
 Don Kirshner (1934–2011), music publisher and promoter who co-founded Aldon Music
 Allen Klein (1931–2009), founder of ABKCO Music & Records, Inc., former manager of the Rolling Stones
 Lester Koenig (1917–1977), founder of Contemporary Records
 Michael Lang (1944–), music promoter, founder of Just Sunshine Records, and co-creator of the Woodstock Music & Art Festival
 Morris Levy (1927–1990), co-founder of Roulette Records
 Goddard Lieberson (1911–1977), British-born former president of Columbia Records and the RIAA
 Alfred Lion (1908–1987), German-born co-founder of Blue Note Records
 Avery and Monte Lipman, founders of Republic Records (owns Young Money Entertainment, Cash Money Records)
 Herman Lubinsky (1896–1974), founder of Savoy Records
 Lee Magid (1926–2007), record producer
 Fred Mendelsohn (1917–2000), former president of Savoy Records
 Lewis Merenstein (1934–2016), record producer
 Doug Morris (1938–), chairman of Sony Music Entertainment, former chairman and CEO of the Universal Music Group, founder of Big Tree Records
 Jerry Moss (1935–), co-founder of A&M Records
 Syd Nathan (1904–1968), founder of King Records
 Guy Oseary (1972–), Israeli-American CEO of Maverick, co-founder of Maverick Management; manager of Madonna, U2
 Mo Ostin (1927–2022), record executive at Verve, Reprise Records, Warner Bros. Records, and DreamWorks
 Lou Pearlman (1954–2016), record producer, founder of Trans Continental Records; manager/creator of the Backstreet Boys and NSYNC
 Randy Phillips (1954/1955–), former president of the Anschutz Entertainment Group (AEG) and current president and CEO of LiveStyle (formerly SFX Entertainment)
 Milton Rackmil (1906–1992), co-founder of Decca Records and former head of Universal Pictures
 Teddy Reig (1918–1984), founder of Roost Records
 Gary Richards (1970–), president of LiveStyle, North America
 Steve Rifkind (1962–), founder of Loud Records and SRC Records, former vice president of Universal Motown Records
 Elliot Roberts (1943–2019), co-founder of Asylum Records; manager of Neil Young and Joni Mitchell
 Samuel Roxy Rothafel (1882–1936), theatrical impresario
 Rick Rubin (1963–), co-founder of Def Jam Recordings, former co-president of Columbia Records
 Larry Rudolph (1963–), founder of Reign Deer Entertainment, co-founder of Maverick Management; manager of Britney Spears
 Art Rupe (1917–2022), founder of Specialty Records
 Bob Shad (1920–1985), founder of Time Records and Mainstream Records
 Cary Sherman, chairman and CEO of the Recording Industry Association of America (RIAA)
 Robert F. X. Sillerman (1948–2019), founder of LiveStyle, Inc. and CKX, Inc. (now Industrial Media); owned majority rights to Graceland, the Elvis Presley estate
 Robert Ellis Silberstein (1946–), music industry executive; former manager and husband of Diana Ross
 Tom Silverman, founder of Tommy Boy Records, former vice president of Warner Bros. Records
 Phil Spector (1939–2021), co-founder of record labels Philles and Warner-Spector; developer of the Wall of Sound formula
 Jules C. Stein (1896–1981), co-founder of the Music Corporation of America; member of the Stein family
 Seymour Stein (1942–), former VP of Warner Bros. Records Inc., co-founder of Sire Records
 Bernard Stollman (1929–2015), founder of the ESP-Disk record label
 Nat Tarnopol (1931–1987), record producer, president of Brunswick Records; manager of Jackie Wilson
 Lenny Waronker (1941–), former president of Warner Bros. Records and co-chairman of DreamWorks Records
 George Wein (1925–2021), music producer, impresario, and founder of the Newport Jazz Festival
 Bob Weinstock (1928–2006), former owner of Prestige Records
 Barry Weiss (1959–), co-founder of RECORDS, former chairman and CEO of the Island Def Jam Music Group and the RCA/Jive Label Group
 Hy Weiss (1923–2007), Romanian-born founder of Old Town Records
 Jerry Wexler (1917–2008), former co-owner of Atlantic Records; coined the term "rhythm and blues" (R&B)
 Walter Yetnikoff (1933–2021), former president of CBS Records International and former CEO of CBS Records
 Hans Zimmer (1957–), German-American head of the film music division at DreamWorks, co-founder of Remote Control Productions, Inc.

Newspapers and publishing

 Tom Allon, publisher of City & State, former co-owner of Manhattan Media LLC
 Walter Annenberg (1908–2002), founder of Triangle Publications, Inc. (the Philadelphia Inquirer, TV Guide)
 Herbert R. Axelrod (1927–2017), founder of TFH Publications
 Jason Binn (1968–), founder of Niche Media (Hamptons, Aspen Peak, Gotham) and DuJour Media
 Paul Block (1875–1941), president of Block Communications and publisher of the Pittsburgh Post-Gazette and the Toledo Blade
 Bennett Cerf (1898–1971), co-founder of Random House
 Jerry Finkelstein (1916–2012), former publisher of the New York Law Journal and the Hill
 Bart Fles (1902–1989), Dutch-American former literary agent and publisher
 Jane Friedman, co-founder of Open Road Integrated Media, former president and CEO of HarperCollins Publishers LLC
 Hugo Gernsback (1884–1967), Luxembourgish-born inventor and magazine publisher, founder of Experimenter Publishing (Amazing Stories, Electrical Experimenter, Radio News); Hugo Award eponym
 Milton Glaser (1929–2020), co-founder of the New York Magazine, creator of the "I Love New York" logo
 Al Goldstein (1936–2013), co-founder of Screw
 Martin Goodman (1908–1992), founder of Timely Publications (later Marvel Comics)
 Jonathan Greenblatt (1970–), former CEO of GOOD Worldwide, Inc.
 Hank Greenspun (1909–1989), publisher of the Las Vegas Sun
 Alfred Harvey (1913–1994), comic book publisher, founder of Harvey Comics, Inc. (Richie Rich, Casper the Friendly Ghost)
 Ruth Sulzberger Holmberg (1921–2017), publisher of the Chattanooga Times
 Morton L. Janklow (1930–2022), co-founder of Janklow & Nesbit Associates, the largest literary agency in the world
 Bruce Judson (1958–), former General Manager at Time Inc. New Media, co-founder of Time Warner's banner ad website Pathfinder
 Jonathan Karp (1963/1964–), publisher of Simon & Schuster
 Don Katz (1952–), founder of Audible
 Larry Kirshbaum (1944–), former chief of publishing for Amazon Publishing and CEO of the Time Warner Book Group
 Donald S. Klopfer (1902–1986), co-founder of Random House
 Alfred (1892–1984) and Blanche Knopf (1894–1966), founders of publishing house Alfred A. Knopf, Inc.
 Meredith Kopit Levien (born 1970/1971), CEO of The New York Times Company
 Harvey Kurtzman (1924–1993), Mad
 Bruce Levenson, (1949–) co-founder of the United Communications Group (UCG), former co-owner of NBA's Atlanta Hawks
 Jay Levin, founder of LA Weekly
 Ross Levinsohn, former publisher of the Los Angeles Times, CEO of Tribune Interactive (the digital arm of tronc), former president of Fox Interactive
 Jack Liebowitz (1900–2000), Russian-born former co-owner of National Allied Publications (later DC Comics)
 Peter Mayer (1936–2018), British-born co-founder of the Overlook Press, and former CEO of Penguin Books
 Eugene Meyer (1875–1959), publisher of The Washington Post
 Donald Newhouse (1929–), owner of Advance Publications, Inc.
 S. I. Newhouse Sr. (1895–1979), founder of Advance Publications, Inc., the parent company of Condé Nast (GQ, Pitchfork, the New Yorker, Vanity Fair, Vogue, W, Wired) and American City Business Journals (ACBJ)
 Adolph Ochs (1985–1935), Arthur Hays Sulzberger (1891–1968), Arthur Ochs Sulzberger (1926–2012), the New York Times
 Norman Pearlstine (1942–), media executive, CCO at Bloomberg L.P. and Time Inc., former executive editor of the Wall Street Journal
 David J. Pecker (1951–), chairman and CEO of American Media, Inc. (National Enquirer, Us Weekly, Star, Flex, Globe, Men's Fitness)
 Marty Peretz (1938–), The New Republic
 Warren H. Phillips (1926–2019), former long-time CEO of Dow Jones & Company
 Joseph Pulitzer (1847–1911), Hungarian-born former publisher of the St. Louis Post-Dispatch and the New York World; known for pioneering yellow journalism and establishing the Pulitzer Prizes
 Axel Rosin (1907–2007), German-born president of the Book of the Month Club
 Arthur M. Sackler (1913–1987), former publisher of the Medical Tribune and chairman of Medical Press, Inc.; member of the Sackler family
 M. Lincoln Schuster (1897–1970), Austrian-born co-founder of Simon & Schuster
 Leon Shimkin (1907–1988), former executive and partner at Simon & Schuster
 Sime (1873–1933), Sidne (1898–1950), Syd Silverman (1932–2017), former owners and publishers of Variety
 Richard L. Simon (1899–1960), co-founder of Simon & Schuster; member of the Simon family
 Roger Williams Straus Jr. (1917–2004), co-founder of book publishing company Farrar, Straus and Giroux (FSG); member of the Guggenheim family
 Reuben Sturman (1924–1997), former adult magazine publisher and co-founder of Doc Johnson Enterprises
 Joshua Topolsky (1977–), co-founder of Vox Media, Inc. (the Verge, SB Nation, Polygon, Curbed), founder of digital media company The Outline
 Helen Valentine (1893–1986), founder of Seventeen magazine
 Jann Wenner (1946–), co-founder of the Rolling Stone
 Richard Saul Wurman (1935–), co-founder of TED
 William Bernard Ziff Sr. (1898–1953), co-founder of Ziff Davis
 Mortimer Zuckerman (1937–), Canadian-American publisher of U.S. News & World Report, former owner of the New York Daily News, The Atlantic and Fast Company, co-founder of Boston Properties, Inc.

Television, film and video

 Merv Adelson (1929–2015), co-founder of Lorimar Television
 Edmund Ansin (1936–2020), co-founder of Sunbeam Television Corporation
 Avi Arad (1948–), Israeli-American founder of Marvel Studios, LLC, former CEO of Toy Biz
 Samuel Z. Arkoff (1918–2001), co-founder of American International Pictures; inventor of the "ARKOFF formula"
 Adam Aron (1954–), president and CEO of movie theater chain AMC Entertainment Holdings, Inc. and co-owner of NBA's Philadelphia 76ers
 Ted Ashley (1922–2002), chairman of Warner Bros. and VC of Warner Communications Inc., founder of the Ashley-Famous talent agency
 Barney Balaban (1887–1971), co-founder of the Balaban and Katz Theater Corporation and former long-time president of Paramount Pictures; member of the Balaban family
 Gary Barber (1957–), South African-born former CEO of Metro-Goldwyn-Mayer (MGM), co-founder of the Spyglass Media Group
 Chuck Barris (1929–2017), founder of game show production company Barris Industries (the Gong Show, the Dating Game)
 Phil Berg (1902–1983), co-founder of the Berg-Allenberg talent agency
 Bruce Berman (1952–), chairman and CEO of Village Roadshow Pictures
 Gail Berman (1956–), founding partner of the Jackal Group, co-founder of media company BermanBraun (now Whalerock Industries)
 Jason Blum (1969–), founder of Blumhouse Productions
 Lloyd Braun (1958–), owner of Whalerock Industries, former chairman of the ABC Entertainment Group
 Alan N. Braverman (1947/1948–), senior EVP, secretary and general counsel of the Walt Disney Company
 Bernie Brillstein (1931–2008), founder of the Brillstein Company
 Norman Brokaw (1927–2016), chairman of the William Morris Agency
 Jerry Bruckheimer (1943–), founder of Jerry Bruckheimer Inc., co-founder and co-owner of NHL's Seattle Kraken
 Peter Chernin (1951–), media executive & investor, founder of the Chernin Group; former president and COO of News Corp.
 Joel and Ethan Coen (1954–, 1957–), founders of Mike Zoss Productions
 Harry Cohn (1891–1958), co-founder of Columbia Pictures (formerly Cohn-Brandt-Cohn (CBC) Film Sales)
 Warren Cowan (1921–2008), co-founder of Rogers & Cowan 
 Barry Diller (1942–), media executive, chairman of IAC/InterActiveCorp, former CEO of Paramount Pictures and Fox, Inc.
 Eddie Einhorn (1936–2016), (co-)founder of the TVS Television Network and pay-TV channel SportsVision, former head of CBS Sports, and co-owner of MLB's Chicago White Sox
 Michael Eisner (1942–), founder of the Hollywood Pictures Company and the Tornante Company, former long-time CEO of the Walt Disney Company
 Ari Emanuel (1961–), co-CEO of William Morris Endeavor Entertainment, LLC (WME) and the International Management Group (IMG)
 Robert Evans (1930–2019), media executive, president of Paramount Pictures
 Barbara Fedida (1964/1965–), ABC News executive
 Erik Feig, former co-president of Lions Gate Entertainment Corp., founder of new media company Picturestart
 Charles K. Feldman (1905–1968), founder of the Famous Artists talent agency
 Jon Feltheimer (1951–), CEO of Lions Gate Entertainment Corp.
 Dave (1894–1979) and Max Fleischer (1883–1972), founders of Fleischer Studios (later Paramount Cartoon Studios)
 William Fox (1879–1952), Hungarian-born founder of the Fox Film Corporation and De Luxe
 Reuven Frank (1920–2006), Canadian-born broadcast executive, former president of NBC News
 Rob Friedman (1950–), co-chairman of Lionsgate Films, Summit Entertainment
 Fred W. Friendly (1915–1998), former president of CBS News
 Jeff Gaspin (1960–), former chairman of NBC Universal Television Entertainment
 Alan Gerry (1929–), founder of Cablevision Industries
 Gary Gilbert (1965–), founder of Gilbert Films, co-owner of NBA's Cleveland Cavaliers
 Adam Glasser (1964–), founder of Seymore, Inc.
 Yoram Globus (1943–), Israeli-American former co-owner of the Cannon Group, Inc., founder of Rebel Way Entertainment
 William Goetz (1903–1969), co-founder of Twentieth Century Pictures (later 20th Century Fox)
 Leonard Goldenson (1905–1999), founder of the American Broadcasting Company (ABC)
 Samuel Goldwyn (1879–1974), Polish-born founder of the Goldwyn Pictures Corporation and Samuel Goldwyn Productions; member of the Goldwyn family
 Steve Golin (1955–2019), founder of Anonymous Content LLP, co-founder of Propaganda Films
 Sid Grauman (1879–1950), founder of the Chinese Theatre and the Egyptian Theatre
 Brian Grazer (1951–), co-founder of Imagine Entertainment
 Bob Greenblatt (1959/1960–), former chairman of NBC Entertainment and WarnerMedia
 Brad Grey (1957–2017), co-founder of Brillstein Entertainment Partners, former chairman of Paramount Pictures
 Mindy Grossman (1957–), former CEO of Home Shopping Network (HSN)
 Sandy Grushow (1960–), CEO of Phase 2 Media, former chairman of the Fox Television Entertainment Group
 Peter Guber (1942–), chairman and CEO of the Mandalay Entertainment Group, former CEO of PolyGram Films, co-owner of NBA's Golden State Warriors and MLB's Los Angeles Dodgers
 Bonnie Hammer (1950–), chairman of NBCUniversal Content Studios
 Albie Hecht, CCO of digital media studio Pocket.watch, former Executive Vice President of HLN, founder of Spike TV
 Doug Herzog (1959–), former president of the Viacom Music and Entertainment Group and USA Network
 Andy Heyward (1949–), former chairman and CEO of DIC Entertainment, founder of Genius Brands International
 Steven Hirsch (1961–), founder of Vivid Entertainment
 Alan F. Horn (1943–), chairman of The Walt Disney Studios, former president and COO of Warner Bros., co-founder of Castle Rock Entertainment
 Johnny Hyde (1895–1950), Russian-born talent agent, former vice-president of WMA, and known for developing the career of Marilyn Monroe
 Bob Iger (1951–), Executive Chairman of the Walt Disney Company
 Jeffrey Katzenberg (1950–), co-founder of DreamWorks, former chairman of Walt Disney Studios
 Ryan Kavanaugh (1974–), co-founder of Relativity Media
 Marc Klaw (1858–1936), former theatre owner and co-founder of the Theatrical Syndicate
 Eugene V. Klein (1921–1990), Chairman and chief stockholder of National General Corporation
 Jon Klein, former president of CNN
 John Kohn (1925–2002), former head of production for EMI
 Steve Koonin (1957–), former president of Turner Broadcasting System
 Kay Koplovitz (1945–), co-founder of USA Network
 David Kramer (1968/1969–), co-president of United Talent Agency
 Ynon Kreiz, American-Israeli media executive, co-founder of Fox Kids Europe, former chairman and CEO of Endemol, and Maker Studios, Inc.
 Alex Kurtzman (1973–), (co-)founder of film and television production companies K/O Paper Products and Secret Hideout
 Jeff Kwatinetz (1965–), COO of Cube Vision, founder of the Firm, Inc., co-founder of 3-on-3 basketball league Big3
 Andrew Lack, chairman of the NBCUniversal News Group, former chairman and CEO of Bloomberg News and Sony Music Entertainment
 Carl Laemmle (1867–1939), German-born co-founder of Universal Pictures
 Greg Lansky (1982–), French-American co-founder of adult film company Vixen
 Abe Lastfogel (1898–1984), former long-time president of WMA
 Norman Lear (1922–), co-founder of ELP Communications and Tandem Productions
 Avi Lerner (1947–), Israeli-American co-founder of Nu Image and Millennium Films, co-owner of Bulgaria-based Nu Boyana Film Studios, Eastern Europe's largest film production studios
 Gerald M. Levin (1939–), former executive at Time Warner, Inc. and HBO
 Harvey Levin (1950–), founder of TMZ
 Marcus Loew (1870–1927), founder of Loew's theater chain, co-founder of Metro-Goldwyn-Mayer
 Michael Lynton (1960–), British-American former chairman and CEO of Sony Pictures Entertainment, chairman of Snap Inc.
 Ted Mann (1916–2001), founder of Mann Theatres
 Louis B. Mayer (1884–1957), Belarus-born co-founder of Metro-Goldwyn-Mayer (MGM)
 Mike Medavoy (1941–), Chinese-born co-founder of Orion Pictures and Phoenix Pictures, former chairman of TriStar Pictures; member of the Medavoy family
 Barry Meyer (1946–), former chairman of Warner Bros. Entertainment
 Ronald Meyer (1944–), Vice chairman of NBCUniversal, former CEO of Universal Studios, co-founder of the Creative Artists Agency (CAA)
 Lorne Michaels (1944–), Canadian-American founder of multimedia entertainment studio Broadway Video, creator of Saturday Night Live
 Arnon Milchan (1944–), Israeli-American Hollywood mogul, founder of Regency Enterprises, co-founder of Summit Entertainment LLC; former Israeli spy
 Harold (1907–1968), Marvin (1918–2002) and Walter Mirisch (1921–), founders of the Mirisch Company
 Les Moonves (1949–), president and CEO of the CBS Corporation, former co-COO of Viacom, Inc.
 Leslie Morgenstein, CEO of Alloy Entertainment
 Neal H. Moritz (1959–), founder of Original Film
 Larry Namer, co-founder of E!
 Marc Nathanson (1945–), cable television pioneer, founder of Falcon Cable
 James M. Nederlander (1922–2016), former chairman of the Nederlander Organization, one of the largest live theater owners in the U.S.; member of the Nederlander family
 David Nevins (1966–), chairman of Showtime Networks (SNI) and CCO of the CBS Corporation
 Mosheh Oinounou (1982–), executive producer of CBS Evening News
 Noah Oppenheim (1977/1978–), president of NBC News
 Tom Ortenberg (1960–), former CEO of Open Road Films, founder of distribution company Briarcliff Entertainment
 Michael Ovitz (1946–), former president of Disney, co-founder of the Creative Artists Agency (CAA)
 Amy Pascal (1958–), former co-chairman of Sony Pictures Entertainment (stepped down due to 2014's Sony Pictures hack), founder of Pascal Pictures
 Richard Plepler (1960–), former chairman and CEO of HBO
 Eric Pleskow (1924–2019), Austrian-born media executive, president of United Artists, and co-founder of Orion Pictures
 Henry G. Plitt (1918–1993), founder of the Plitt Theatres chain
 Tom Pollock (1943–2020), co-founder of the Montecito Picture Company, former chairman of Universal Pictures
 Steven Price (1962–), co-founder of Townsquare Media and minority owner of NBA's Atlanta Hawks
 Gigi Pritzker (1962–), co-founder of MWM Studios (formerly known as OddLot Entertainment); member of the Pritzker family
 Mark Rachesky (1960–), chairman of Lions Gate Entertainment Corp.
 Brett Ratner (1969–), co-founder of RatPac Entertainment
 Shari Redstone (1954–), chairman of ViacomCBS
 Sumner Redstone (1923–2020), media magnate, former chairman of Viacom and the CBS Corporation; majority owner of National Amusements, Inc.
 Rob Reiner (1947–), co-founder of Castle Rock Entertainment
 Burt Reinhardt (1920–2011), former president of CNN and co-founder of United Press International Television News
 Charles Rivkin (1962–), CEO of the Motion Picture Association of America (MPAA), former CEO of the Jim Henson Company (a.k.a. Muppets, Inc.)
 Henry C. Rogers (1914–1995), co-founder of Rogers & Cowan
 Tom Rosenberg (1947/1948–), co-founder of the Lakeshore Entertainment Group
 Michael S. Rosenfeld (1934–2010), co-founder of Creative Artists Agency.
 David Rhodes (1973–), former president of CBS News, former head of Bloomberg Television North America
 Rich Ross, former executive at Discovery Channel and CEO of Shine USA
 Steve Ross (1927–1992), founder of Time Warner
 Joe Roth, former chairman of 20th Century Fox, Caravan Pictures and the Walt Disney Studios, founder of Revolution Studios, co-founder of Morgan Creek Productions
 Samuel Roxy Rothafel (1882–1936), former theatre owner and impresario
 Tom Rothman (1954–), chairman of the Sony Pictures Motion Picture Group
 Haim Saban (1944–), Egypt-born Israeli-American media mogul, founder of Saban Entertainment and the Saban Capital Group, co-creator of Power Rangers
 Josh Sapan (1951–), president and CEO of AMC Networks Inc.
 David Sarnoff (1891–1971), Belarus-born founder of RKO Pictures and former general manager of RCA
 James Schamus (1959–), co-founder of Good Machine (acquired by Universal in 2002), former CEO of Focus Features
 Lou Scheimer (1928–2013), co-founder of Filmation
 Joseph M. Schenck (1876–1961), co-founder of Twentieth Century Pictures and the Academy of Motion Picture Arts and Sciences (a.k.a. the Academy)
 Leon Schlesinger (1884–1949), founder of Leon Schlesinger Productions (later Warner Bros. Cartoons, Inc.)
 Reese Schonfeld (1931–2020), co-founder of CNN and pay-TV channel The Food Network
 Josh Schwartz (1976–), co-founder of Fake Empire Productions
 Teddy Schwarzman (1979–), founder of Black Bear Pictures
 Joseph Segel (1931–2019), founder of home shopping channel QVC and the Franklin Mint
 David O. Selznick (1902–1965), founder of Selznick International Pictures
 Neal Shapiro (1958–), president and CEO of WNET, former president of NBC News
 Robert Shaye (1939–), founder of New Line Cinema
 Sidney Sheinberg (1935–2019), former long-time executive at MCA Inc. and Universal Studios, founder of the Bubble Factory
 Ben Sherwood (1964–), former co-chairman of Disney Media Networks and president of the Disney-ABC Television Group and ABC News
 Alon Shtruzman, Israeli-American CEO of Keshet International
 George Sidney (1916–2002), co-founder of Hanna-Barbera Productions, Inc.
 Joel Silver (1952–), founder of Silver Pictures and co-founder of Dark Castle Entertainment
 Ben Silverman (1970–), founder of Electus, former co-chairman of NBC Entertainment and Universal Media Studios, chairman of entertainment production company Propagate
 Fred Silverman (1937–2020), former president and CEO of NBC, founder of the Fred Silverman Company
 Bryan Singer (1965–), founder of Bad Hat Harry Productions
 Harry E. Sloan (1950–), former chairman of Metro-Goldwyn-Mayer and the SBS Broadcasting Group
 Jeff Smulyan (1947–), founder of Emmis Communications, and former owner of MLB's Seattle Mariners
 Stacey Snider (1961–), former chairman of Universal Pictures, CEO of 20th Century Fox
 Aaron Spelling (1923–2006), founder of Spelling Television Inc. (Beverly Hills, 90210) and co-founder of Spelling-Goldberg Productions
 Mark Spiegler (1958/1959–), founder of Spiegler Girls, Inc.
 Steven Spielberg (1946–), co-founder of DreamWorks and Amblin Entertainment
 Ray Stark (1915–2004), founder of film production company Rastar (acquired by Columbia Pictures in 1974), co-founder of Seven Arts Productions
 David Steiner, founder of Brooklyn-based Steiner Studios
 Jay Sures (1966–), co-president of United Talent Agency
 Larry Tanz, VP of Global Television at Netflix, former president and CEO of Vuguru and LivePlanet, co-founder of Agility Studios
 Laurence Tisch (1923–2003), former CEO of CBS
 Jeff Wachtel, president of Universal Cable Productions
 Dana Walden (1964–), co-chair and co-CEO of Fox Broadcasting Company
 Albert (1884–1967), Harry (1881–1951), Jack (1892–1978) and Sam Warner (1887–1927), founders of Warner Bros. (WB)
 Lew Wasserman (1913–2002), former executive at MCA Inc.
 Bob (1954–) and Harvey Weinstein (1952–), founders of Miramax Films (acquired by Disney in 1993) and the Weinstein Company (now Lantern Entertainment)
 Jerry Weintraub (1937–2015), founder of the Weintraub Entertainment Group (WEG)
 Tom Werner (1950–), co-founder of the Carsey-Werner Company and the Fenway Sports Group (owns MLB's Boston Red Sox, EPL's Liverpool F.C.)
 Patrick Whitesell (1965–), media executive, co-CEO of William Morris Endeavor and the International Management Group (IMG)
 Irwin Winkler (1931–), co-founder of Chartoff-Winkler Productions and Winkler Films
 Mitchell Wolfson (1900–1983), co-founder of the Wolfson-Meyer Theater Company, and former Mayor of Miami Beach, Florida
 Frank Yablans (1935–2014), president of Paramount Pictures
 David Zaslav (1960–), president and CEO of Discovery, Inc., former executive at NBCUniversal
 Strauss Zelnick (1957–), former chairman of CBS Corporation
 Mike Zimring (1916–2011), senior agent at the William Morris Agency
 Susan Zirinsky (1952–), president of CBS News
 Jeff Zucker (1965–), chairman of WarnerMedia News & Sports, former CEO of NBCUniversal
 Adolph Zukor (1873–1976), Austro-Hungarian-born film mogul, co-founder of Paramount Pictures

See also
 Lists of Jewish Americans
 Businesspeople
 in finance
 in real estate
 in retail

References

American people of Jewish descent
Jewish